Joseph Villevieille (1829–1916) was a French painter.

Early life
Joseph Villevieille was born on 6 August 1829 in Aix-en-Provence. He graduated from the École des Beaux-Arts in Paris.

Career
Villevieille taught painting in Aix-en-Provence. He became friends with Paul Cézanne, whose mother he painted shortly before she died.

When the townhall of Aix-en-Provence was burgled on 22 August 1872, Villevieille was commissioned to do many paintings for its walls. Some of those paintings were portraits of prominent local painters like Jean-Baptiste van Loo and François Marius Granet, and local historian Scholastique Pitton. In 1900, he did a painting of Sextius Calvinus, the founder of Aix-en-Provence, which is also in the collection of the townhall.

Death and legacy
Villevieille died on 11 February 1916 in Aix-en-Provence. He was buried at the Saint-Pierre Cemetery in Aix-en-Provence. The Avenue joseph villevieille in Aix-en-Provence was named in his honor.

References

1829 births
1916 deaths
Artists from Aix-en-Provence
École des Beaux-Arts alumni